The 2021 Trans-Am Series season was the 53rd running of the Trans-Am Series. The National Championship began on February 19 and will run for 14 rounds with one being only for TA2 cars and two only paying points for the Pro/Am Challenge. The Pro/Am Challenge was held for the first time to help SCCA competitors try out Trans Am. Points were given for two specific Pro/Am Challenge races and four other races of competitor's choice in either the national Trans Am Series or the Trans Am West Coast Championship. A separate West Coast Championship was also held with some rounds separate from the national series and some together.

Entry List

National Championship

West Coast Championship

Race Schedule and Results

National Championship 
A 15-round preliminary schedule was released on October 19, 2020 ahead of the final two rounds of the 2020 season. The schedule represented a return to normality after the Coronavirus outbreak heavily impacted the 2020 season. Trans-Am will be having its first ever race at the newly renovated Charlotte Motor Speedway Roval and a TA2-only round at the inaugural running of the Music City Grand Prix on the streets of Nashville. No double-headers are scheduled to return following their appearances in 2020; however, all tracks that were featured on the preliminary 2020 calendar are scheduled for 2021 as well. For the first time in series history, Trans-Am is instituting a drop-round system where competitors can choose to drop their two worst round results including non-appearances that took place before August 1.
On April 30, Trans-Am announced that the scheduled round at Canadian Tire Motorsport Park had been cancelled due to the ongoing pandemic, replaced by an additional round at the following Watkins Glen International meeting.

West Coast Championship 
A 7-round preliminary schedule was released on October 28, 2020 ahead of the final round of the 2020 national championship season. The schedule represented a return to normality after the Coronavirus outbreak heavily impacted the 2020 season. The West Coast series will be hosting its first ever races at Utah Motorsports Park and The Ridge Motorsports Park.

Championship Standings

Points System 

When only one driver is entered in a class, half of the point value is awarded; if two drivers then 60% points, if three then 70% points, if four then 85% points. If there are fewer than three drivers, qualifying points are not awarded. If there are fewer than five drivers, lap leading points are not awarded.

Pro/Am Challenge drivers cannot earn points for the National Championship or West Coast  and vice versa. Pro/Am Challenge points are counted for the two Pro/Am Challenge races as well as four National Championship or West Coast Championship events of each competitor's choice. One of the Pro/Am Challenge races was held in combination with a West Coast Championship race, however the results and classification were separate.

Awards are given to the highest ranked Master and Rookie drivers in each class. The Master classification is given to drivers over 60 years old while the Rookie classification is for drivers competing in their first full year. Some drivers may be eligible for both.

In the National Championship, each driver's worst two round results including non-appearances before August 1st are dropped.

National Championship

TA

TA2

XGT

SGT

GT

West Coast Championship

TA2

XGT

SGT

Notes

External links 

 Official website

References 

Trans-Am Series
Trans-Am Series